Return to Chaos is an original novel based on the U.S. television series Buffy the Vampire Slayer. Tagline: "Under the cover of darkness".

Plot summary

When four Druids arrive in town everyone knows that something is going on. Three of the Druids are brothers and the other is their uncle. They're in town to try a spell on a certain night to close the gateway in the Hellmouth so that demons would not be allowed to pass through. They'd done it a year before with their father but the spell was not completed and the brothers lost their father in the midst of the spell. Giles is a little put off by the uncle and feels that he's not being told everything that he should know. Also gathering is a large community of vampires run by Eric and his apprentice Naomi, who has been playing nasty tricks with Cordelia's mind by hypnotizing her. Things start to go wrong; magic appears everywhere and the brothers turn against their uncle. On the night of the spell Buffy must manage to fix the spell or deter the uncle from his task as well as figure out what is going on with Eric and his gang.

Characters include: Buffy, Joyce, Giles, Xander, Cordelia, Willow, Oz and Angel. Drusilla is found to be a user of a spell that would explain her ease in killing Kendra.

Continuity

Supposed to be set late in Buffy season 3.

Canonical issues

Buffy comics such as this one are not usually considered by fans as canonical. Some fans consider them stories from the imaginations of authors and artists, while other fans consider them as taking place in an alternative fictional reality. However unlike fan fiction, overviews summarising their story, written early in the writing process, were 'approved' by both Fox and Joss Whedon (or his office), and the books were therefore later published as officially Buffy merchandise.

External links

Reviews
Litefoot1969.bravepages.com - Review of this book by Litefoot
Teen-books.com - Reviews of this book
Nika-summers.com - Review of this book by Nika Summers
Shadowcat.name - Review of this book

1998 novels
Books based on Buffy the Vampire Slayer